Abubakr Ben Ishmael Salahuddin is an American religious writer.

He was formerly an Ahmadi and wrote many articles for the Ahmadi magazine Review of Religions, as well as two books promoting Ahmadi beliefs. The Afrocentric Myth or Islam, an appeal to Ahmadi beliefs from the perspective of a former "Black Cultural Nationalist" and Black Muslim, and Saving the Savior around the Ahmadi conception of Jesus and related teachings on the Roza Bal tomb in Kashmir. In 2003, he repudiated Islam and converted to the Baháʼí Faith.

Publications
The Afrocentric Myth or Islam: The Liberator of the American People, 1995
Saving the Savior - Did Christ Survive the Crucifixion?, 2001

References

20th-century American male writers
21st-century American male writers
American Ahmadis
American Bahá'ís
American former Muslims
Converts to the Bahá'í Faith from Islam
Living people
Swoon hypothesis
Year of birth missing (living people)